The Utah Department of Environmental Quality is a state governmental organization located in Salt Lake City, Utah. DEQ's mission is to safeguard public health and our quality of life by protecting and enhancing the environment. DEQ implements State and federal environmental laws and works with individuals, community groups, and businesses to protect the quality of our air, land and water.

External links
 Official site
 Air Monitoring App (Desktop Version)
 Utah Environmental Interactive Map

Environment of Utah
Environment
State environmental protection agencies of the United States
Environmental Quality